"Kaulana Nā Pua" (literally, "Famous are the flowers") is a Hawaiian patriotic song written by Eleanor Kekoaohiwaikalani Wright Prendergast (April 12, 1865 – December 5, 1902) in 1893 for members of the Royal Hawaiian Band

who protested the overthrow of Queen Liliʻuokalani and the Hawaiian Kingdom. The song is also known under the title of Mele ʻAi Pōhaku, the Stone-Eating Song, or Mele Aloha ʻĀina, the Patriot's Song. It is still popular in Hawaiʻi today, although it is not clear how many non-Hawaiian speaking listeners are aware of the song's historical significance or the profound antipathy to U.S. annexation in its lyrics.

According to Elbert and Mahoe (1970), "The song was considered sacred and not for dancing."  However, today hālau hula perform Kaulana Nā Pua as a hula ʻauana for makuahine (a graceful dance for mature women).

The Hawaiian lyrics,

with one English translation of them, are:

{| border=0 |
|
Kaulana nā pua aʻo Hawaiʻi 
Kūpaʻa mahope o ka ʻāina 
Hiki mai ka ʻelele o ka loko ʻino 
Palapala ʻānunu me ka pākaha
||
Famous are the children of Hawaiʻi 
Ever loyal to the land 
When the evil-hearted messenger comes 
With his greedy document of extortion
|-
|
Pane mai Hawaiʻi moku o Keawe 
       
Kōkua nā Hono aʻo Piʻilani 
Kākoʻo mai Kauaʻi o Mano 
Paʻapū me ke one Kākuhihewa
||
Hawaiʻi, land of Keawe answers 
The bays of Piʻilani help 
Kauaʻi of Mano lends support 
All are united by the sands of Kākuhihewa
|-
|
ʻAʻole aʻe kau i ka pūlima 
Maluna o ka pepa o ka ʻenemi 
Hoʻohui ʻāina kūʻai hewa 
I ka pono sivila aʻo ke kanaka
||
Do not fix a signature 
To the paper of the enemy 
With its sin of annexation 
And sale of the civil rights of the people
|-
|
ʻAʻole mākou aʻe minamina 
I ka puʻukālā a ke aupuni 
Ua lawa mākou i ka pōhaku 
I ka ʻai kamahaʻo o ka ʻāina
||
We do not value 
The government's hills of money 
We are satisfied with the rocks 
The wondrous food of the land
|-
|
Mahope mākou o Liliʻulani 
A loaʻa e ka pono o ka ʻāina 
    [alternate stanza: 
     A kau hou ʻia e ke kalaunu] 
Haʻina ʻia mai ana ka puana 
Ka poʻe i aloha i ka ʻāina
||
We support Liliʻuokalani 
Who has won the rights of the land 
    [alternate stanza: 
     She will be crowned again] 
The story is told 
Of the people who love the land
|}

The "government" referred to in the song is the Provisional Government of Hawaii (which was later to become the Republic of Hawaii and subsequently the territory and state), proclaimed by the conspirators upon seizing power. Mrs. Prendergast composed the song for the Royal Hawaiian Band, who:
… had just walked out on their jobs after the bandmaster demanded they sign an oath of loyalty to the Provisional Government… . The bandmaster said they had better sign or they would be eating rocks. It is obvious that they meant it was not right to sell one's country or loyalty to one's country for money. If we hold on to the land, the land will always feed us. … [L]and endures. 
—Noenoe Silva, assistant professor in political science, University of Hawaiʻi at Mānoa, in Honolulu Weekly

The Hawaiian Renaissance has lent the song Kaulana Nā Pua renewed significance in recent years. Its words are often cited in the context of the Hawaiian sovereignty movement as an expression of opposition to U.S. rule.

References
 Elbert, Samuel H. and Noelani Mahoe, "Nā Mele o Hawaiʻi Nei, 101 Hawaiian Songs", University of Hawaii Press, Honolulu, 1970, 

 Liliuokalani, "Hawaii's Story by Hawaii's Queen", Charles E. Tuttle Company, Inc., Tokyo, Japan, 1964

Hawaiian songs
Overthrow of the Hawaiian Kingdom
Patriotic songs
Symbols of Hawaii
1893 songs